Tasmania's Relationships Act 2003 provided for registration and recognition of a type of registered partnership in two distinct categories: Significant Relationships and Caring Relationships. The same Act also amended 73 pieces of legislation to provide registered partners with nearly all of the rights offered to married couples within the state. Furthermore, since July 2009, these relationships are recognised at federal level, providing couples with almost all of the federal rights and benefits of marriage. The legislation came into effect on 1 January 2004. In September 2010, the Parliament of Tasmania approved legislation to recognize same-sex unions performed outside Tasmania as significant relationships.

Significant relationships
Both same-sex and opposite-sex couples can register a Significant Relationship if both are unrelated, unmarried adults living in Tasmania.

Caring relationships
Likewise, two adults residing in Tasmania, related or not, can register a Caring Relationship if one provides the other with domestic support and personal care. The parties cannot be married to each other, cannot be in an existing significant or caring relationship, and neither can be receiving payment for the care of the other either from employment or government departments.

Rights and benefits
Both types of relationships provide some rights in the following areas:

Superannuation (pension/retirement benefits)
Taxation
Insurance
Health care
Hospital visitation
Wills
Property division
Employment conditions (such as parenting and bereavement leave)

Adoption, surrogacy and parenting rights
Tasmanian law allows same-sex couples to adopt. The Adoption Act 1988 states that "an order for the adoption of a child may be made in favour of two persons who, for a period of not less than 3 years before the date on which the order is made, have been married to each other or have been the parties to a significant relationship which is the subject of a deed of relationship registered under Part 2 of the Relationships Act 2003." The Adoption Act 1988 was amended by the Parliament in June 2013 to allow same-sex couples to adopt children not known to them.

Under section 10C of the Status of Children Act 1974, same-sex partners of women who give birth to children conceived through sperm donation, IVF or other artificial reproductive technology are presumed to be the child's other parent or co-mother in the same way as male partners of heterosexual women. Both mothers' can be placed on the birth certificate, allowing such couples to have access to the same rights of/for their children (such as medical or hospital forms, education processes, access to entitlements, etc.). The legislation on parentage from IVF is retrospective (meaning the laws applied to co-mothers even before it went into effect).
 
Also under the Adoption Act 1988 (section 29) for a birth-mother's same-sex partner to adopt any children she has through fertility treatment under the stepchild adoption provision.

In 2012, Tasmania passed two pieces of legislation to legally allow altruistic surrogacy. The two laws are called the Surrogacy Act No 34 and the Surrogacy (Consequential Amendments) Act No 31 Proposed altruistic surrogacy legislation was drafted and passed by both houses of the Tasmanian parliament - only after a review of the Surrogacy Contracts Act 1993 No 4 and after an ongoing community consultation process. Under the altruistic surrogacy legislation, the surrogate must be at least 25 years old and it cannot be her first pregnancy. The new altruistic surrogacy laws came into effect on 1 January 2013.

In July 2013, Tasmania became the fourth jurisdiction in Australia to allow same-sex couples full adoption rights (joining New South Wales, Western Australia and the Australian Capital Territory). However, since February 2017, all jurisdictions of Australia allow same-sex couples to legally adopt children - except for the Northern Territory.

Recognition from other jurisdictions of Australia 

Partnerships that are registered in Tasmania are not automatically recognised in most parts of Australia when travelling or moving interstate. Since being elected in 2007, the then current Prime Minister, Kevin Rudd, had been encouraging all states to create relationship registers identical to Tasmania's model to create nationwide uniformity and consistent rights, while at the same time not supporting anything that appears too similar to marriage. The following jurisdictions currently recognise Tasmanian registered partnerships since August 2017:

 Australian Capital Territory (civil union - was civil partnership)
 New South Wales (registered partnership)
 South Australia (registered partnership)
 Queensland (civil partnership - was registered partnership)
 Victoria (registered domestic partnership)

As of 21 October 2014, Victorian statute does not recognise the registered relationships of any other jurisdiction, including Tasmania's. However, in February 2016, the Victorian Parliament passed a bill recognising same-sex unions performed outside of Victoria and thus recognising those performed in Tasmania.

The Australian Commonwealth Government also recognises a Tasmanian registered partnership as a "de facto relationship" under federal law. De facto couples, whether same-sex or opposite-sex, are entitled to nearly all of the federal rights of marriage since 1 July 2009.

In September 2010, the Tasmanian parliament passed legislation to recognize out-of-state same-sex unions as a significant relationships.

Registration
Applications for Significant or Caring Relationships can be registered in person or by mail by filing an application for a Deed of Relationship with the Tasmanian Registry of Births, Deaths and Marriages in Hobart.

Government plan for legalizing same-sex marriage
In August 2012 Tasmanian premier Lara Giddings announced that Tasmania would pass new laws allowing same-sex couples to marry. However, although the same-sex marriage bill passed 13–11 in the lower house, the Legislative Council rejected the bill 6–8 on 27 September 2012.

Federal legalization of same-sex marriage
Same-sex marriage became legal in Tasmania, and in the rest of Australia, in December 2017, after the Federal Parliament passed a law legalising same-sex marriage.

2021 Supreme Court of Tasmania ruling
In February 2021, it was reported by LGBTQI+ media the Star Observer - Tasmania never officially legally ever recognized same-sex relationships at all from a ruling of the Supreme Court of Tasmania.

See also 
LGBT rights in Australia
Same-sex marriage in Australia

References

External links
Tasmanian Registry of Births, Deaths, and Marriages
Foreign recognition of registered Tasmanian relationships
Text of the Tasmanian Relationships Act 2003
Partners Task Force for Gay and Lesbian Couples: "Relationships Act: The Tasmanian Approach"
 Relationships Tasmania

Australian family law
Tasmanian law
Tasmania